Manyinga is a constituency of the National Assembly of Zambia. It covers the towns of Katala, Loloma, Manyinga and Nyundu in Manyinga District of North-Western Province. Until 2016, it was named Kabompo East.

List of MPs

References

Constituencies of the National Assembly of Zambia
Constituencies established in 1991
1991 establishments in Zambia